XHACT-FM is a radio station on 91.7 FM in Actopan, Hidalgo, part of the Radio y Televisión de Hidalgo state radio network.

History
XHACT received its most recent permit in 1999.

References

Radio stations in Hidalgo (state)
Public radio in Mexico